The Louisiade Archipelago is a string of ten larger volcanic islands frequently fringed by coral reefs, and 90 smaller coral islands in Papua New Guinea.

Rogeia, Samarai and Sariba lie closest to New Guinea, while Misima, Vanatinai, and Rossel islands lie further east.

History 
The islands were discovered by a Spanish expedition led by Luis Váez de Torres in 1606, that was part of the Fernandez de Quiros fleet which had sailed from South America in search of Australia. The Torres expedition visited various islands including Basilaki Island, which he named San Buenaventura in July 1606. It is possible that Malay and Chinese sailors also visited the islands earlier. More than a century later, in 1768, Louis Antoine de Bougainville visited the islands and named them for Louis XV, the king of France. Visits were also paid by Admiral Bruni d'Entrecasteaux in 1793 and Captain Owen Stanley in 1849.

The 1942 Battle of Coral Sea was fought nearby, after Japanese occupation in the same year.  The Deboyne Islands were the site of the 1942 Raids on Deboyne.

Rain forests 
The islands have a moist tropical climate, and are largely covered with tropical moist broadleaf forests. The Louisiade Archipelago rain forests form a distinct ecoregion, and are home to a number of endemic species, including several endemic trees (in genera Pandanus, Diospyros, and Hopea), as well as five endemic frog species, two endemic lizard species, and five endemic bird species.

Government
The archipelago is divided into the Local Level Government (LLG) areas Bwanabwana Rural (western part, with Basilaki), Louisiade Rural (central part, with Misima), and Yaleyamba (eastern part, with Rossell and Vanatinai islands). The LLG areas are part of Samarai-Murua District of Milne Bay. The seat of the Louisiade Rural LLG is Bwagaoia on Misima Island, the population center of the archipelago.
The seat of the Yaleyamba is changed every couple of years between Rambuso and Jingo  (Rossell).
The seat of the Bwanabwana was Samarai from the Louisiade archipelago, but was recently transferred to the mainland of Papua New Guinea to the city of Alotau.

Islands 
The Louisiade Archipelago consists of the following island groups and islands:

See also
List of islands of Papua New Guinea
Louisiade Rural LLG

References

External links 

 
 Milne Bay Province Polling list with place names (2007)
 Eusoils.jrc.it: detailed geology/soils map (1:1.000.000)
 Louisiades.net: Information and advice for yachts and travellers visiting the Louisiade Archipelago islands

 
Archipelagoes of the Pacific Ocean
Archipelagoes of Papua New Guinea
Australasian ecoregions
Ecoregions of Papua New Guinea
.01
Lists of islands of Papua New Guinea
Tropical and subtropical moist broadleaf forests
Volcanoes of Papua New Guinea
Endemic Bird Areas